Load Records was an American experimental music-oriented independent record label based out of Providence, Rhode Island. "Load Records might possibly be in possession of the world's most challenging record roster," writes Mark Hensch of Thrash Pit. "Rounded out by some of the most uncompromising noise/avant-garde/experimental artists in all of music's sordid underbelly, Load has always prided itself on remaining outside of common taste and maybe even common sense."

History
Load Records was started by Ben McOsker in order to put a 7-inch record out for the band Boss Fuel. The label quickly became the most prominent source for noise music coming out of Providence, Rhode Island - loosely functioning in the same way that Sub Pop served grunge out of Seattle in the early 1990s. "Ben McOsker got into the business of running a label on a whim," said Stylus Magazine, "and now, after more than ten years of operation, Load Records has become one of the preeminent names in noise music. By signing acts like Lightning Bolt, Sightings and Noxagt, McOsker has expanded the notions of noise and helped bring numerous Providence bands to the ears of discerning listeners." Some claim McOsker and Mullen have released some of the most exciting noise/experimental music of the early 2000s, including music from Lightning Bolt, Neon Hunk, Metalux, Noxagt, and Friends Forever. Others have attributed a cookie-cutter aesthetic to the label, mostly in terms of the masks/costumes worn by a number of the bands. However, later records released by Load have run the gamut from strict noise-based squeal of Prurient and the Yellow Swans. Load also features a number of bands operating in a more metal vein such as Khanate, OvO, Necronomitron, and Brainbombs.

The music of Load Records is popularized and reviewed through national zines like Blastitude, Arthur, and Dead Angel.

On April 11, 2017, the label revealed they would be coming to an end: "After 24 years of Load Records its time to move on. Will be contacting bands to arrange next steps. Thanks for a great ride."

Roster
 Air Conditioning
 Arab On Radar
 Astoveboat
 Brainbombs
 Burmese
 Coughs
 Excepter
 Fat Day
 Fat Worm of Error
 Forcefield
 Friends Forever
 Gerty Farish
 Giant Jesus
 Hawd Gankstuh Rappuh MC's
 the Hospitals
 thee Hydrogen Terrors
 Khanate
 Kites
 Kites/Prurient
 Landed
 Lightning Bolt
 Men's Recovery Project
 Metalux
 Mindflayer
 Monotract
 Mr. California and the State Police
 Mystery Brinkman
 Nautical Almanac
 Necronomitron
 Neon Hunk
 Noxagt
 the Ohsees (aka OCS)
 Olneyville Sound System
 OvO
 Pink and Brown
 Pleasurehorse
 Prurient
 the Scissor Girls
 Sightings
 Silver Daggers
 Six Finger Satellite
 Swordheaven
 Thee Hydrogen Terrors
 Tinsel Teeth
 Total Shutdown
 the USAISAMONSTER
 Ultralyd
 Vincebus Eruptum
 John Von Ryan
 Vaz
 the White Mice
Whore Paint
 Wizardzz

See also
Load Records catalog
List of record labels

References

External links
 Official website (archived)

American independent record labels
Record labels established in 1993
Noise music record labels
Experimental music record labels